Felix Austria may refer to:

 'Bella gerant alii, tu felix Austria nube,' (let others wage war, thou, happy Austria, marry) a saying about the house of Habsburg . This famous saying is invariably quoted when the rise of the Habsburgs is put down to the success of their dynastic marriage policy, in which young archdukes and archduchesses were frequently married off as children to members of other dynasties, or indeed to relatives of their own.
 Felix Austria (company), a food company
 Felix Austria!, a 2013 documentary

See also
 Name of Austria